Abdul Rasul is an Arabic male given name, meaning servant of the prophet.

Abdul Rasul may also refer to:

People
Abdul Rasul Sayyaf (born 1946), Afghan Islamist politician
Salah Abdul Rasool Al Blooshi (born 1981), Bahraini held in Guantanamo
Abdul Rasul (Iraqi scientist) (died 1983), Iraqi nuclear engineer, reportedly killed by Israel
Abdul Rasul (Uyghur), Pakistani citizen of Uyghur origin, leader of the Asian Muslims Human Rights Bureau

Other uses
21483 Abdulrasool, asteroid